Günther Kriz (born 12 October 1940) is a former Austrian cyclist. He competed in the 1000m time trial and team pursuit events at the 1960 Summer Olympics.

References

External links
 

1940 births
Living people
Austrian male cyclists
Olympic cyclists of Austria
Cyclists at the 1960 Summer Olympics
Cyclists from Vienna
20th-century Austrian people